Vladimirovsky (masculine), Vladimirovskaya (feminine), or Vladimirovskoye (neuter) is the name of several rural localities in Russia:
Vladimirovsky, Kursk Oblast, a settlement in Dmitriyevsky District of Kursk Oblast
Vladimirovsky, Oryol Oblast, a settlement in Bolkhovsky District of Oryol Oblast
Vladimirovsky, name of several other rural localities
Vladimirovskaya, a stanitsa in Krasnosulinsky District of Rostov Oblast
Vladimirovskoye, Republic of Adygea, a settlement in Giaginsky District of the Republic of Adygea
Vladimirovskoye, Novosibirsk Oblast, a selo in Ubinsky District of Novosibirsk Oblast
Vladimirovskoye, Smolensk Oblast, a village in Safonovsky District of Smolensk Oblast